CJSC Sky Express, simply known as Sky Express and in Russian as Скай Экспресс, was a Russian low-cost airline. Its main base was Vnukovo International Airport, Moscow, Russia.

Sky Express was the first airline to focus on being a low-cost domestic airline in Russia. It operated from January 2007 until October 2011.

History 
The airline was established in March 2006 by a consortium of investors which included KrasAir CEO Boris Abramovich, EBRD, Altima Partners and others, becoming Russia's first low-cost airline. The first flight took off on 29 January 2007 from Moscow to Sochi.

Merger with Kuban Airlines 

Only 20 days after the only other Russian low-cost airline, Avianova, ceased its operations, Sky Express also decided to stop all flights from 29 October 2011. Its fleet and brand name was transferred to Kuban Airlines.

Destinations 

In March 2011, Sky Express served the following destinations:

Regular flights 
Russia
Anapa – Anapa Airport
Chelyabinsk – Chelyabinsk Balandino Airport
Kaliningrad – Khrabrovo Airport
Krasnodar – Krasnodar International Airport
Moscow – Vnukovo Airport, base
Murmansk – Murmansk Airport
Orenburg – Orenburg Tsentralny Airport
Perm – Bolshoye Savino Airport
Rostov on Don – Rostov-on-Don Airport
Saint Petersburg – Pulkovo Airport
Sochi – Adler-Sochi International Airport
Tyumen – Roschino Airport
Yekaterinburg – Koltsovo Airport

Charter flights 
Additionally, Sky Express operated charter flights on a seasonal basis to the following destinations during the summer of 2009 and 2010:

Finland (winter 2009–2010)
Kuusamo – Kuusamo Airport
Rovaniemi – Rovaniemi Airport
Greece
Heraklion – Nikos Kazantzàkis International Airport
Corfu – Ioannis Kapodistrias International Airport
Rhodes – Diagoras International Airport
Hungary
Sármellék – Sármellék International Airport
Montenegro
Tivat – Tivat Airport
Spain
Ibiza – Ibiza Airport
Republic of Macedonia
Ohrid – St. Paul the Apostle Airport
Sweden
Östersund – Åre/Östersund (winter 2009–2010)
Turkey
Istanbul – Atatürk International Airport

Fleet 

The Sky Express fleet consisted of the following aircraft in November 2011:

Incidents 

On 24 October 2008, the crew of Sky Express flight XW230 from Sochi to Vnukovo Airport with 132 passengers, reported an attempted hijacking by a drunk passenger, and threatened to explode a bomb demanding the airplane to divert to Vienna. The crew raised a hijack alert almost immediately after liftoff.  Emergency services and police were awaiting the plane in Moscow, and the passenger was arrested.
On 2 April 2009, a Boeing 737 of Sky Express made an emergency landing at Vnukovo Airport shortly after takeoff when abnormal vibrations from the jet's left engine were detected by the crew. None of the 69 people on board were hurt.

References

External links 

 Official website 

Defunct airlines of Russia
Defunct European low-cost airlines
Companies based in Moscow
Airlines established in 2006
Airlines disestablished in 2011
2006 establishments in Russia